Juan José Pedro de la Carrera y Verdugo or Juan José Pedro Carrera (Santiago, Captaincy General of Chile, June 26, 1782—Mendoza, United Provinces of the Río de la Plata, April 8, 1818) was a Chilean soldier and patriot who actively participated in the first phase of the Chilean War of Independence, a stage known as the Old Homeland.  In support for his brother José Miguel Carrera, and together with his younger brother Luis and other Republican officers, he formed one of the main factions within the supporters of Independence: the Carrerino group. He was shot to death in Mendoza together with his brother Luis de él, at the hands of the city authorities.

Public life 
In March 1813, during José Miguel's absence, he was appointed member of the Board of Governors.

In 1813, with the rank of brigadier, he participated in some of the first military actions of the Independence; such as the Siege of Chillán and the Battle of San Carlos.

In the fall of 1814 he remained exiled in Mendoza, by order of the Supreme Director Francisco de la Lastra. During said exile he earned the dislike of the local governor, José de San Martín.

Back in Chile, he participated in a new coup, on July 23, which overthrew De la Lastra and briefly reinstated José Miguel in supreme command. At the end of September of the same year, 1814, he assumed command of the Second Division of the patriot army, which was ready to close the Cachapoal River the passage to the forces of the royalist Mariano Osorio, who were heading to take the capital. Faced with this desperate situation, and on the eve of assuming such an uncertain commission, he married Ana María Cotapos.

References 

19th-century Spanish military personnel
Chilean military personnel
1782 births
1818 deaths